Dudelange-Usines railway station is a railway station serving the south of Dudelange, in southern Luxembourg.  It is operated by Chemins de Fer Luxembourgeois, the state-owned railway company.

The station is situated on Line 60, which connects Luxembourg City to the Red Lands of the south of the country.  It is the fourth station on the branch to the French town of Volmerange-les-Mines.  Dudelange-Centre is one of four railway stations in the city.

External links
 Official CFL page on Dudelange-Usines station
 Rail.lu page on Dudelange-Usines station

Usines railway station
Railway stations on CFL Line 60